The Bill Emerson Good Samaritan Food Donation Act was created to encourage food donation to nonprofit organizations by minimizing liability. Signed into United States law by President Bill Clinton, this law, named after Representative Bill Emerson (who encouraged the proposal but died before it was passed), makes it easier to donate 'apparently wholesome food' by excluding donor liability except in cases of gross negligence or intentional misconduct.

Emerson died on June 22, 1996.

The Federal Food Donation Act of 2008 built on this legislation by encouraging federal agencies to donate excess food to nonprofit organizations, utilizing the exemption for civil and criminal liability provided for in the 1996 law. Federal contracts for the purchase of food valued at over $25,000 must make provision for contractors to donate apparently wholesome excess food to nonprofit organizations.

See also
 Child Nutrition Act
 Good Samaritan law

References

External links
 Text of law
 News story of the law in action
 An Act to Encourage the Donation of Food and Grocery Products to Nonprofit Organizations for Distribution to Needy Individuals by Giving the Model Good Samaritan Food Donation Act the Full Force and Effect of Law
 Good Samaritan Day

Acts of the 104th United States Congress
United States tort law